The table below shows all results of Volkswagen Motorsport in World Rally Championship.

WRC results

Group 4 era

Group A era

*Including points scored with different manufacturers.

WRC era

S-WRC results

J-WRC results

References
 results at juwra.com

External links

result
World Rally Championship constructor results